The list of the ferries of the East Frisian Islands contains the ferries currently serving the islands of Borkum, Juist, Norderney, Baltrum, Langeoog, Spiekeroog and Wangerooge. The East Frisian Islands, located between the Wadden Sea and the North Sea in Germany, have been inhabited for centuries by people and have long been a popular holiday region in East Friesland. Traditionally, these ferries serve to transport people and goods, and are a most important link between the mainland and island ports.

List 

Transport
East Frisia
East Frisian Islands